The Universal Power Adapter for Mobile Devices (UPAMD), codename IEEE 1823-2015 (before approval P1823), is an IEEE standard for power supply design intended to cater to the power range of  (optionally  for mobile devices like laptop computers. 

This minimum life of adapter was hoped to reduce electronic waste.

A common direct current power plug is intended to make life easier by eliminating the confusion regarding what voltage and current transformer one needs to buy and carry.  This can help mobile devices, laptops, many consumer electronic devices, office devices like Ethernet switches/hubs, and wireless routers to use the same power adapter around the world.

This specification defines a communication channel between device and adapter, to negotiate the requirements and supply.

Usage 
There seem to be no known examples of commercial deployments of UPAMD in end-user devices. When asked about deployment in 2019, the chair for IEEE 1823 working group wrote the following:

History 
The Standards Association of the Institute of Electrical and Electronics Engineers (IEEE) approved the Universal Power Adapter for Mobile Devices working group on June 17, 2010.
The project was sponsored by the Microprocessor Standards Committee of the IEEE Computer Society.

On 15 May 2015 the standard was published as IEEE Std 1823-2015.

See also 
 USB Power Delivery Rev. 3.1 - includes Standard Power Range (SPR) mode with up to 100 W of power (20 V @ 4 A) and Extended Power Range (EPR) mode with up to 240 W of power (48 V @ 5 A)
 IEC 62700 "IEC Technical Specification 62700: DC Power supply for notebook computer"
 Common external power supply for smartphones (EN 62684:2010 / IEC 62684:2011)

References

External links 
IEEE 1823-2015 - IEEE Standard for Universal Power Adapter for Mobile Devices - IEEE

DC power connectors
IEEE standards
Power supplies
Laptops
Battery charging